Catopsis wawranea is a species in the genus Catopsis. This species is native to Costa Rica, Belize, and Mexico (Veracruz, Oaxaca).

References

wawranea
Flora of Costa Rica
Flora of Belize
Flora of Mexico
Plants described in 1896